Zoning is the fifty-third release and twenty-first soundtrack album by Tangerine Dream.

Personnel
Edgar Froese - synthesizers, guitar

References

1996 albums
Tangerine Dream albums